Jangpura Assembly constituency is one of the seventy Delhi assembly constituencies of Delhi in northern India.
Jangpura assembly constituency is a part of South East Delhi (Lok Sabha constituency).
It is a posh neighbourhood in South Delhi district of Delhi divided into Jangpura, Jangpura Extension, Jangpura A and Jangpura B.

Members of Legislative Assembly
Key

Election results

2020

2015

2013

2008

2003

1998

1993

Other State Wings

Uttarakhand Wing
In 2018 Gopal Rai introduced Uttarakhand wing in Aam Aadmi Party Delhi. In January 2021 Arvind Kejriwal announced that AAP would be contesting in 2022 Uttarakhand Legislative Assembly election. On 17 August 2021, AAP declared Colonel Ajay Kothiyal as their Chief Ministerial candidate for the assembly election. RJ Raawat is the President of Uttarakhand Wing for Jangpura Assembly Delhi.

References

Assembly constituencies of Delhi
Delhi Legislative Assembly